Yaeyama may refer to one of several naval ships of Japan:

 , a Japanese-built cruiser of French design built for the Imperial Japanese Navy; participated in the First Sino-Japanese War and the Russo-Japanese War; scrapped in 1911
 , a World War II minelayer in the Imperial Japanese Navy; sunk by American carrier-based aircraft near Palawan Island in September 1944 

Imperial Japanese Navy ship names
Japanese Navy ship names